The Colorado Mammoth is a lacrosse team based in Denver, Colorado playing in the National Lacrosse League (NLL). The 2012 season was the 26th in franchise history and 10th as the Mammoth (previously the Washington Power, Pittsburgh Crossefire, and Baltimore Thunder).

Regular season

Conference standings

Game log
Reference:

Playoffs

Game log
Reference:

Transactions

Trades

Dispersal Draft
The Mammoth chose the following players in the Boston Blazers dispersal draft:

Entry draft
The 2011 NLL Entry Draft took place on September 21, 2011. The Mammoth selected the following players:

Roster

See also
2012 NLL season

References

Colorado
Colorado Mammoth seasons
2012 in sports in Colorado